The flag of Palau was adopted on 1 January 1981, when the island group separated from the United Nations Trust Territory. As with the flags of several other Pacific island groups, light blue is the color used to represent the ocean and the nation's place within it. While this puts Palau in common with the Federated States of Micronesia and other neighboring island groups, the disc on the flag (similar to that on Japan's flag) is off-centre like that of the flag of Bangladesh, but in this case the disc represents the moon instead of the sun. The current flag was introduced in 1981 when Palau became a republic.

Previously, the flag of the Trust Territory of the Pacific Islands was flown jointly with the United Nations and American flags. The explanation for the choice of colors is rooted in the history and customs of the Palauan people. The light blue of the field symbolizes the Pacific Ocean, and also represents the transition from foreign domination to self-government. The golden disk, which sits slightly off-center toward the hoist, represents the full moon. The Palauans consider the full moon to be the optimum time for human activity. At this time of the month, celebrations, fishing, sowing, harvesting, tree-felling, and the carving of traditional canoes are carried out. The moon is a symbol of peace, love, and tranquility.

Construction 

According to the Palauan government website, the flag is a golden-yellow full moon slightly off-centered on a field of sky blue. The width of flag is 13⁄5 of the flag's height, meaning the aspect ratio is 5:8. The moon's diameter is 3⁄5 of the flag's height, its center is placed on the middle of the flag's height and the 7⁄10 part of the flag's height from the hoist side.

Tenuous relationship to the Rising Sun Flag
Japanese international relations professor Futaranosuke Nagoshi has suggested that the Palauan flag pays tribute to the Rising Sun Flag of Japan and symbolizes amity between Palau and Japan. Former Palauan President Kuniwo Nakamura responded to this theory in an interview with the ambiguous statement, "That's one way of putting it." John Blau Skebong, the designer of the flag, denied such allegation, saying there is no special connection between the two flags.

Governmental flags

Historical flags

See also
 Flags of the states of Palau

References

External links
Introduction of the flag at Palau National Government 

Republic of Palau Convention History of the National Flag
Similarities between flags of Bangladesh, Japan, and Palau

Palau
National symbols of Palau
Palau